William Talman (1650–1719) was an English architect and landscape designer.

Career 
A pupil of Sir Christopher Wren, in 1678 he and Thomas Apprice gained the office of King's Waiter in the Port of London (perhaps through his patron Henry Hyde, 2nd Earl of Clarendon).  From May 1689 until William III's death in 1702, he was Comptroller of the Royal Works, and also in 1689 William Bentinck, 1st Earl of Portland appointed Talman and George London as his deputies in his new role as Superintendent of the Royal Gardens.  In these roles Talman worked with Wren in his rebuilding of Hampton Court Palace and its gardens and, by proposing a cheaper interior decoration scheme for the new building, won that commission over Wren's head.

Works 
Talman's principal work is recognised to be Chatsworth House, considered to be the first baroque private house in Britain, and he was possibly the architect of St Anne's Church, Soho.  Talman was held by many to be surly, rude and difficult to get on with. One of those who felt so was Charles Howard, 3rd Earl of Carlisle, who chose John Vanbrugh, not Talman, as his architect for Castle Howard (Vanburgh had also been Talman's replacement as Comptroller of the Royal Works in May 1702.)

During his long career, Talman worked on many of England's country houses. These include:

Cannons, Edgware (1713)
Dyrham Park, Gloucestershire (1698)
Fetcham Park House, Surrey (1699)
Hanbury Hall, Worcestershire
Herriard Park, Hampshire (c.1700)
Kimberley Hall, Norfolk (c.1700)
Lowther Castle, Cumbria (1692)
Milton Hall, Peterborough (UA)
Swallowfield Park, Berkshire (1689)
Uppark, West Sussex (c.1690, UA)
Waldershare Park, Kent (1705, attributed).

Gallery of architectural works

References

Bibliography
 Harris, John, The Hampton Court Trianon Designs of William and John Talman, in Journal of the Warburg and Courtauld Institutes, xxiii, 1960.
 Harris, John, William Talman: Maverick Architect. London, Allen and Unwin. 1982. Studies in Architecture, 2.
 Saunders, Edward, Bretby Hall, in Derbyshire Life, August 1975.
 Whinney, M.D., William Talman, in Journal of the Warburg and Courtauld Institutes, xviii, 1955.

External links

Talman, William at the Oxford Dictionary of National Biography. 
 The Talman Family Group at the National Portrait Gallery
 

1650 births
1719 deaths
English Baroque architects
English landscape and garden designers
Hampton Court Palace